Stratford-on-Avon is a constituency represented in the House of Commons of the UK Parliament since 2010 by Nadhim Zahawi, a member of the Conservative Party, who briefly served as the Chancellor of the Exchequer in mid-2022. The constituency is in Warwickshire, and is centred on the town of Stratford-on-Avon, yet includes the surrounding areas around the town, including the towns of Alcester and Henley-in-Arden.

Members of Parliament

MPs 1885–1918

MPs since 1950

Constituency profile
The seat includes the historic town itself, as with Warwick, a major place in England for international tourism with its buildings, museums and Royal Shakespeare Company theatre, surrounded by green belt villages southeast of Birmingham, with the next largest wards being Studley and Alcester each with just under 5,000 electors.

Workless claimants, registered jobseekers, were in November 2012 significantly lower than the national average of 3.8%, at 1.4% of the population based on a statistical compilation by The Guardian.

Boundaries

The constituency consists of relatively widely spaced rural villages, inhabited largely by commuters, with its boundaries taking in the eponymous town and the south and west of the Stratford-on-Avon local government district. 

2010–present: The District of Stratford-on-Avon wards of Alcester, Aston Cantlow, Bardon, Bidford and Salford, Brailes, Claverdon, Ettington, Henley, Kinwarton, Long Compton, Quinton, Sambourne, Shipston, Snitterfield, Stratford Alveston, Stratford Avenue and New Town, Stratford Guild and Hathaway, Stratford Mount Pleasant, Studley, Tanworth, Tredington, Vale of the Red Horse, and Welford.

1997–2010: All the wards of the District of Stratford-on-Avon except the wards of Henley, Tanworth, and Tanworth Earlswood.

1983–1997: The District of Stratford-on-Avon.

1974–1983: As 1950 but with redrawn boundaries.

1950–1974: The Borough of Stratford-upon-Avon, and the Rural Districts of Stratford-on-Avon, Alcester, Shipston-on-Stour, and Southam.

1885–1918: The Boroughs of Stratford-upon-Avon, Warwick, and Leamington, the Sessional Divisions of Alcester, Brailes, Henley, Stratford, Snitterfield, and Warwick, and the part of the Sessional Division of Kenilworth in the Parliamentary Borough of Warwick and Leamington.

At the 2010 general election, following the Fifth Periodic Review of Westminster constituencies, this seat was reduced in size: a new constituency of Kenilworth and Southam was created, taking in much of the eastern half of the previous version of this constituency, along with parts of the abolished seat of Rugby and Kenilworth.

History since 1950
Since its recreation in 1950, the seat has elected only Conservatives.  The earliest member, John Profumo, was noted for his personal life scandal; another MP, Alan Howarth, served on the benches of the Labour Party for two years, choosing to cross the floor.

Political history
With the exception of a relatively close 1963 by-election, the constituency has always returned majorities of over 20% for the Conservatives. Up until 1970, Labour always came second and the Liberals (when they stood) third; and the Liberal/Liberal Democratic parties came second and Labour third in every subsequent general election until 2010. The only occasion on which any other party has been in the top three (or managed to save their deposit) was in 2015, when UKIP came second with just over 13% of the vote. Since then, Labour has come second in 2017, and the Liberal Democrats in 2019.

Elections

Elections in the 2010s

Elections in the 2000s

Elections in the 1990s

Elections in the 1980s

Elections in the 1970s

Elections in the 1960s

Elections in the 1950s

Election results 1885-1918

Elections in the 1910s 
General Election 1914–15:

Another General Election was required to take place before the end of 1915. The political parties had been making preparations for an election to take place and by July 1914, the following candidates had been selected; 
Unionist: Philip Foster
Liberal: John Pascoe Elsden

Elections in the 1900s

Elections in the 1890s

Elections in the 1880s

See also
 List of parliamentary constituencies in Warwickshire

Notes

References

Politics of Stratford-upon-Avon
Parliamentary constituencies in Warwickshire
Constituencies of the Parliament of the United Kingdom established in 1885
Constituencies of the Parliament of the United Kingdom disestablished in 1918
Constituencies of the Parliament of the United Kingdom established in 1950